Battagram may refer to:

Battagram, a city in north-eastern Khyber Pakhtunkhwa, Pakistan
Battagram District
Battagram Tehsil
Battagram Valley
Battagram, Charsadda, a town in north-western Khyber Pakhtunkhwa, Pakistan

See also